Patrick Cudahy Jr.; March 17, 1849 – July 25, 1919) was an American industrialist in the meat packing business and a patriarch of the Cudahy family.

Biography
Cudahy was born on St. Patrick's Day in Callan, County Kilkenny, Ireland. A few months after he was born, his family emigrated to Milwaukee, Wisconsin.  He worked his way up at the Plankinton and Armour meat packing plant in the Menomonee Valley, becoming the superintendent in 1874.  In 1888, the owner, John Plankinton, transferred the company to Patrick and his brother, John.  The company became known as Cudahy Brothers.

In 1892, Cudahy moved the company to a 700-acre (2.8 km²) plot of land south of Milwaukee which he and his brother John bought for the purpose. This land was in the former Town of Lake, which is now divided between the municipalities of Milwaukee, St. Francis, and Cudahy.

Cudahy "had a bittersweet relationship with the village of Cudahy" in part because he supported temperance and "fought against liquor". He "argued with the Cudahy Common Council about the spread of taverns in the village", although he also worked to assist business development and the construction of a new library. He said, "It is a source of satisfaction to me to look over those 25 years and see what has been accomplished, but I would feel much better if there were not the antagonistic spirit in Cudahy which seems to prevail to a great extent among its citizens."

Cudahy died in Milwaukee on July 25, 1919, and was interred in his family mausoleum at Calvary Cemetery.

Family
Patrick Cudahy Sr., father
 Michael Cudahy (1841-1910), brother (president of Armour-Cudahy company, co-founder of Cudahy Packing Company (Omaha), and the city of Cudahy, California
 John Cudahy (1843-1915), brother (silent partner of Patrick Jr. in the meat packing plants, Milwaukee and Chicago; Louisville)
 Patrick Cudahy Jr. (1849-1919), self
 Michael Francis Cudahy (1886-1970), son (President of Patrick Cudahy, Inc. from 1919 onwards)
 John Clarence Cudahy (1887-1943), son (lawyer, real estate broker, and U.S. ambassador to Poland, Ireland and Belgium)
 Helen Cudahy (1890/1-1917), daughter, committed suicide by leaping from a ship into the ocean
 Edward Aloysius Cudahy Sr. (1860-1941), brother, co-founder Cudahy Packing Company (Omaha)
 Edward Aloysius Cudahy Jr. (1884-1961), nephew

References

Further reading
Cudahy, Patrick. Patrick Cudahy: his Life, Milwaukee: Burdick & Allen, 1912.

External links
Biography of Patrick Cudahy at Patrick Cudahy, Inc.

1849 births
1919 deaths
People from Callan, County Kilkenny
Businesspeople from Milwaukee
Cudahy family
Irish emigrants to the United States (before 1923)